Forsythe Bluff is a bluff rising to more than  along the west edge of the Daniels Range, in the Usarp Mountains of Antarctica. It was mapped by the United States Geological Survey from surveys and U.S. Navy air photos, 1960–63, and was named by the Advisory Committee on Antarctic Names after Warren L. Forsythe, a United States Antarctic Research Program geologist at McMurdo Station, 1967–68.

See also 
Misch Crag, 1 nautical mile (2 km) northeast of Forsythe Bluff

References

External links 

Cliffs of Oates Land